The Fox Motor Company was an automobile company in Philadelphia, Pennsylvania from 1921 to 1923.

History 
The Fox Motor Company was founded by Ansley H. Fox (who had already invented the Fox Shotgun) as his second idea for a company. It was organized on November 21, 1919, but did not begin production until March 1921. The cars had air-cooled engines, and, some claim, were the only cars to give Franklin Automobile company a small run-for-its money. It was claimed to get 20 mpg. The cars were bigger than the Franklins. However, it took a long time to get into regular production, and the company could not get enough investors. Therefore, in 1923, the company went out of business.

Models

References 

Defunct motor vehicle manufacturers of the United States
Manufacturing companies based in Philadelphia
History of Philadelphia
Vehicle manufacturing companies established in 1921
1921 establishments in Pennsylvania
Vehicle manufacturing companies disestablished in 1923
1923 disestablishments in Pennsylvania